Salix melanopsis is a plant species known by the common name dusky willow. It is native to western North America from British Columbia and Alberta to California and Colorado, where it grows in many types of moist and wet habitat, such as riverbanks and subalpine mountain meadows, on rocky and silty substrates.

Description
Salix melanopsis is a shrub up to 4 meters tall, sometimes sprouting abundantly from its stem to form colonial thickets of clones. The pointed, oval, lance-shaped, or linear leaves may grow over 13 centimeters long and have smooth or spine-toothed edges. The inflorescence is a catkin of flowers up to 5 or 6 centimeters long.

References

External links
Jepson Manual Treatment
Washington Burke Museum
Photo gallery

melanopsis
Flora of the Sierra Nevada (United States)
Flora of California
Flora of the Western United States
Flora of Canada
Flora of Nevada
Flora of Oregon
Flora of Idaho
Flora of Colorado
Flora of Wyoming
Flora of Montana
Flora of British Columbia
Flora of Alberta
Flora without expected TNC conservation status